Rockdale is an unincorporated community in Whitewater Township, Franklin County, Indiana.

History
The post office Rockdale once contained originally had the name Wissel. It operated from 1886 until 1903.

Geography

References

Unincorporated communities in Franklin County, Indiana
Unincorporated communities in Indiana